The Pakistan Archery Federation is the governing body to develop and promote the game of archery in Pakistan. It is based in Lahore, Pakistan, and was founded in 1996. It was admitted into the World Archery Federation in 2005.

Affiliations
The federation is affiliated with:
 World Archery Federation
 World Archery Asia
 Pakistan Sports Board
 Pakistan Olympic Association

Affiliated associations 
The following associations are associated with PAF:

 Balochistan Archery Association
 Khyber Pakhtunkhwa Archery Association 
 Punjab Archery Association
 Sindh Archery Association 
 Army Sports Directorate 
 Police Sports Board
 Railway Sports Board 
 WAPDA Sports Board

Championships 
Pakistan Archery Federation organizes National Archery Championship annually.
The most recent edition was the 8th National Archery Championship held in Quetta in November 2021.
Archery competitions are also a regular part of the National Games.

References

External links
 Official Website

Sports governing bodies in Pakistan
National members of the Asian Archery Federation